Boboszów  is a village in the administrative district of Gmina Międzylesie, within Kłodzko County, Lower Silesian Voivodeship, in south-western Poland, near the border with the Czech Republic.

The village has a population of 240.

References

Villages in Kłodzko County
Czech Republic–Poland border crossings